Ashley George Hamilton (born September 30, 1974) is an American actor, comedian, and singer-songwriter. He made his acting debut in the 1993 film Beethoven's 2nd. He has since starred in films such as Lost in Africa (1994), Off Key (2001), Lost Angeles (2012), Iron Man 3 (2013), and Cats Dancing on Jupiter (2015). He portrayed the role of Cole Deschanel in the first season of the NBC television series Sunset Beach (1997).

Early and personal life
Hamilton was born in Los Angeles, the son of actors George Hamilton and Alana Stewart. He is the former stepson of musician Rod Stewart. At 19, Hamilton garnered media attention when he and Shannen Doherty married after knowing one another for only two weeks. The marriage lasted just five months before the couple divorced. He was then married to actress Angie Everhart from December 1996 until their divorce in March 1997.
Before Shannen Doherty, he was in a relationship with Claire Stansfield, 10 years his senior.

He has one daughter, Willow, born in November 2016 with Renee Karalian.

Career
In 1993, Hamilton appeared on Saturday Night Live, and starred in the film Beethoven's 2nd. In 1997, he briefly starred in the television series Sunset Beach as Cole Deschanel, but was let go only a month after the premiere.

In addition to his acting career, Hamilton is a singer and songwriter. He fronted the Los Angeles-based rock band Fine. In 1999 the group released their debut and only album to date, "Against the View". In June 2003, Hamilton released a single entitled "Wimmin'" which reached #27 in the UK Singles Chart. The song was co-written by British singer Robbie Williams, who also provided some of the vocals on the track. Hamilton co-wrote Williams' 2003 single "Come Undone". Hamilton also claims that he co-wrote Williams' single "She's Madonna" in 2006, but that Williams omitted his name from publishing.

It was announced on August 17, 2009, he would be competing in season 9 of Dancing with the Stars. He was eliminated first from DWTS on September 23, 2009. Following Dancing with the Stars, Hamilton joined the entertainment news program Extra as a field correspondent.

Since 2007, Hamilton has been performing stand-up comedy at the Hollywood Improv, The Comedy Store, & Room 5 in Los Angeles. In 2013, he appeared as the character Jack Taggert in the Marvel superhero film Iron Man 3. Hamilton also recorded the cover of Sly Fox's Let's Go All the Way along with supergroup The Wondergirls and Robbie Williams for Iron Man 3.

In 2019, Hamilton directed and starred in the erotic horror film Gothic Harvest.

Filmography

Discography

With Fine
Studio Albums
 Against the View (1999)
Singles
 "Wrecking Ball" (1999)

Solo
Singles
 "Wimmin" (2003), #27 UK Singles Chart

References

External links

1974 births
Living people
Male actors from Los Angeles
American pop rock singers
American male singer-songwriters
American rock songwriters
Participants in American reality television series
Singers from Los Angeles
20th-century American male actors
21st-century American singers
American male pop singers
American male film actors
20th-century American comedians
21st-century American comedians
Family of Rod Stewart
Comedians from California
Singer-songwriters from California